("Firefly-fire") is Rythem's twelfth single which was released on February 28, 2007 under Sony Music Entertainment Japan label. The title track was used as the ending theme for TV Tokyo's show FIGHTENSION☆SCHOOL. This single reached the #36 spot in the Oricon weekly charts.

The item's stock number is AICL-1847.

Track listing
Hotarubi
Composition/Lyrics: Yui Nītsu
Arrangement: Satoshi Takebe
Natsu Mero
Composition/Lyrics: Yukari Katō
Arrangement: Masuda TOSH
Hotarubi (instrumental)
Natsu Mero (instrumental)

2007 singles
Rythem songs
2007 songs